Tsovak is a village in the Vardenis Municipality of the Gegharkunik Province of Armenia.

History 
The village is the site of a large Iron Age fort atop the hill to the south and west, with an 8th-century BCE cuneiform inscription of Sarduri II cut into the stone at the north edge of the fortification.

Gallery

References

External links 

 World Gazeteer: Armenia – World-Gazetteer.com
 
 

Populated places in Gegharkunik Province